BioSteel may refer to:

BioSteel Sports Nutrition, a Canadian company
BioSteel (fiber), a material derived from goat's milk

See also
Biosteel, a silk-based material produced by AMSilk